I Ship It is an American musical romantic comedy television series that premiered on June 22, 2016, on CW Seed with the second season on April 10, 2019 and the broadcast premiere on August 19, 2019, on The CW. The series, created by Yulin Kuang, is based on the web series of the same name. It stars Helen Highfield as Ella, an aspiring writer who recklessly quits her job to become a writer's assistant on her favorite TV show. On August 29, 2019, The CW dropped the show after two episodes due to low ratings. The remaining four episodes, along with the aired episodes, are available to stream on CW Seed.

Cast and characters

Main
Helen Highfield as Ella, a young aspiring writer who decides to quit her regular job at a shipping company ("I Ship It") and pursue her dreams by becoming a writer's assistant on her favorite TV Show Superstition.
Riley Neldam as Tim, Ella's long-time boyfriend who also works at I Ship It to save up for his tuition for a graduate program in architecture.
David Witts as Luke, a season two producer on Superstition who hires Ella as the new writer's assistant because the showrunner keeps firing old assistants.
Yasmine Al-Bustami as Sasha/Jasmine, Ella's friend who was recently cast in a minor role on Superstition in season 2 of I Ship It. She finds herself attracted to the female lead of the show.

Recurring
Ethan Peck as Nick/Saxon, the season two male lead of Superstition.
Marissa Cuevas as Kayla/Therese, the season two female lead of Superstition.
Kristen Rozanski as Shira, Ella and Tim's boss at I Ship It.
Jazz Raycole as Winnie, Ella's season two roommate and best friend, who enjoys obsessing over Superstition with Ella.
Gita Reddy as Marina, the showrunner of Superstition.

Notable season two guest stars
Dia Frampton as Amber the Fangirl.
Joey Richter as Sean the Fanboy.

Episodes

Season 1 (2016)

Season 2 (2019)
All songs are sung by Ella (Helen Highfield) unless otherwise noted.

Reception

Ratings

References

External links

2010s American musical comedy television series
2010s American romantic comedy television series
2016 American television series debuts
American romantic drama television series
English-language television shows
The CW original programming